Poppy is a feminine given name derived from the name of the flower poppy, itself derived from the Old English popæg and referring to various species of Papaver.   The name has been among the one hundred most popular names for girls in England and Wales since 1996 and among the top twenty-five names for girls since 2009. It has also recently risen in popularity in other countries in the English-speaking world, including Australia, New Zealand, and the United States. The popularity of the name coincides with increased use for girls of other flower names and names inspired by the natural world. Increased awareness of the name has also been attributed to the naming of the children of some celebrities.

People named Poppy
Poppy (born 1995), stage name of American entertainer Moriah Pereira
Poppy Ackroyd (born 1982), British composer, pianist and violinist 
Poppy Adams, British television documentary director/producer and novelist
Poppy Cannon (1905–1975), South African-American food editor and cookbook writer
Poppy de Villeneuve (born 1979), English director and photographer
Poppy Delevingne (born 1986), British model and socialite
Poppy Gilbert (born 1998), Swedish-born British actress
Poppy Jhakra (born 1984), English actress
Poppy King (born 1972), Australian entrepreneur
Poppy Miller (born 1969), English actress
Poppy Montgomery (born 1972), Australian-American actress
Poppy Drayton (born 1991), British actress
Poppy Harlow (born 1982), American journalist, birth name Katharine Julia Harlow

Fictional characters
 Poppy, a bunny in the Beechwood Bunny Tales children's book series
 Poppy, Keeper of the Hammer, a playable champion character in the MOBA video game League of Legends
 Poppy, a cat puppet in BBC children's TV show Playdays
 Poppy, a mouse in Avi's novels Poppy and Poppy and Rye
 Poppy, a supporting character from the video game Dragon Quest: Shōnen Yangus to Fushigi no Dungeon
 Princess Poppy in Trolls and then Queen Poppy in Trolls World Tour
 Poppy, a yellow cockatiel in Angry Birds Stella and The Angry Birds Movie
 Poppy, in the Kate Cann novel Leaving Poppy
 Poppy, Keeper of the Hammer, a playable champion character in the multiplayer online battle arena video game League of Legends
 Poppy, on Huge (TV series)
 Poppy, squirrel villager in the Animal Crossing video games
 Poppy, the dog of Galford D. Weller from the Samurai Shodown series of fighting games
 Poppy, the principal character in 2008 film Happy-Go-Lucky
 Poppy Adams, from Kingsman: The Golden Circle
 Poppy Brown, from the novel The Stonewalkers by Vivien Alcock
 Poppy Burt-Jones, in the novel White Teeth by Zadie Smith
 Poppy Carew, protagonist of the novel The Vacillations of Poppy Carew by Mary Wesley
 Poppy Cat, the main character in a series of books created by Lara Jones
 Poppy Champion, minor character in the sixth series of Skins (UK TV series) played by Holly Earl
 Poppy Colfax, in the 2009 film Fired Up
 Poppy Eyebright, a mouse in Jill Barklem's Brambly Hedge book series
 Poppy Li, a main character in the show Mythic Quest
 Poppy Lifton, in Gossip Girl, 2008–2012
 Poppy Marshall, one of Haley Dunphy's twins in ABC's Modern Family
 Poppy Meadow, in EastEnders
 Poppy Meldrum, on the television series You Rang, M'Lord?
 Poppy Moore, the main character in the 2008 film Wild Child
 Poppy North, the main character in the first book of the Night World series Secret Vampire
 Poppy O'Hair, twin sister of Holly O'Hair and daughter of Rapunzel from Ever After High
 Poppy Pomfrey, Hogwarts staff member in the Harry Potter series
 Poppy Shakespeare, the title character in a novel by Clare Allan
 Poppy Thornapple, in the book The War of the Flowers
 Poppy Wyatt, the protagonist of the novel I've Got Your Number by Sophie Kinsella

Notes

Feminine given names
English given names
English feminine given names
Given names derived from plants or flowers